"Starting Over Again" is a song recorded by American entertainer Dolly Parton.  The song was written by Donna Summer and her husband Bruce Sudano. Parton's recording was performed as a slow tempo ballad, gradually building to a dramatic crescendo. It was released in March 1980 as the first single from her album Dolly, Dolly, Dolly. "Starting Over Again" made the U.S. pop top forty, peaking at number 36, and reached number 1 on the U.S. country charts on May 24, 1980, becoming Parton's 12th number one.

Donna Summer also recorded it as a non-album track, performing it live numerous time on television specials during the 1980s, including her own program, The Donna Summer Show.

Content
The song tells the story of a middle-aged couple separating after 30 years of marriage.  It was based upon the divorce of Sudano's parents.

Chart history
Weekly

Year-End

Reba McEntire cover

Reba McEntire also covered the song in 1995 for her Starting Over album. Released as the album's third single, McEntire's version peaked at number 19 on the Hot Country Singles & Tracks chart.  In the album's liner notes, McEntire wrote that she chose to cover the song as a tribute to Parton and Summer, both artists whom she'd admired.

Chart history

Other cover versions
Martine McCutcheon covered "Starting Over Again" in 2001.

References

External links
Starting Over Again lyrics at Dolly Parton On-Line
  (Donna Summer)
  (Dolly Parton)
  (Reba McEntire)

1980 singles
1996 singles
Dolly Parton songs
Reba McEntire songs
Songs written by Donna Summer
Song recordings produced by Tony Brown (record producer)
RCA Records Nashville singles
MCA Nashville Records singles
Songs written by Bruce Sudano
1980 songs
Songs about divorce